Puya tristis is a species in the genus Puya. This species is endemic to Bolivia.

References

tristis
Flora of Bolivia